Promecosoma inflatum is a species of leaf beetle. It is found in Mexico, as well as in Arizona in the United States.

References

Further reading

 

Eumolpinae
Articles created by Qbugbot
Beetles described in 1877
Taxa named by Édouard Lefèvre
Beetles of North America